A Separate Creation: The Search for the Biological Origins of Sexual Orientation, also published with the subtitle How Biology Makes Us Gay, is a 1996 book about the development of sexual orientation by the journalist Chandler Burr. It received mainly positive reviews, commending it as a useful discussion of scientific research on sexual orientation and the politics surrounding the issue.

Summary

Burr discusses biological research on sexual orientation by scientists such as the neuroscientist Simon LeVay, the psychiatrist Richard Pillard, the psychologists J. Michael Bailey, Heino Meyer-Bahlburg, and Anke Ehrhardt, and the geneticist Dean Hamer. He writes that a neuroanatomical study published in 1991 was the "first major biological investigation of sexual orientation", and that it was followed by research into genes and hormones. He also discusses the views of critics of the research, such as the evolutionary biologist Richard Lewontin.

Publication history
A Separate Creation was published by Hyperion in 1996, under the full title A Separate Creation: The Search for the Biological Origins of Sexual Orientation. The book was published as A Separate Creation: How Biology Makes Us Gay by Bantam Press in 1997.

Reception

Mainstream media
A Separate Creation received positive reviews from Ray Olson in Booklist, Genevieve Stuttaford in Publishers Weekly, the neurologist Richard Cytowic in The Washington Post, the historian Jonathan Kirsch in the Los Angeles Times, the philosopher Michael Ruse in The Times Literary Supplement, and W. P. Anderson in Choice, a mixed review from Gail Vines in New Scientist, and a negative review from the historian Roy Porter in The New York Times Book Review. The book was also reviewed by Jon Turney in the Times Higher Education Supplement, and discussed by Norman Podhoretz in Commentary.

Olson credited Burr with writing about science well and with covering the arguments of both supporters and critics of biological explanations of sexual orientation and the associated political issues. He suggested that the arguments of scientists who think some findings are "either not so significant, misleading, or downright erroneous" were often more convincing than those of scientists on the other side of the debate. He concluded that A Separate Creation might be "both the gay studies book of the year and the popular-science book of the year." Stuttaford described the book as a "detailed, elegantly written report" on scientific research on sexual orientation, crediting Burr with dispassionately reviewing the scientific and political controversy created by LeVay's 1991 hypothalamus study. Cytowic credited Burr with "disclosing the political meaning of sexual-orientation research" and with "revealing the media's absurd questions and abysmal grasp of science." Kirsch called the book "enlightening" and an "earnest and mostly successful" effort to explain the findings of genetic research. He credited Burr with providing a "compelling profile" of the scientists involved in sexual orientation research and with explaining the politics of the issue.

Ruse considered A Separate Creation a good discussion of its topic. He noted that it had appeared at the same time as several other books about biological research on homosexuality, suggesting that this showed that "publishers know a good thing when they see it." Anderson wrote that Burr provided an "absorbing and comprehensive" discussion of biological research on sexual orientation, and a clearly written "reader-friendly interpretation" of the topic, with a broad presentation of recent findings. He concluded that A Separate Creation would be interesting to both scientists and the general public. Vines described A Separate Creation as a "racy paean to the putative gay gene" and "a masterpiece of American journalese". She wrote that A Separate Creation contained "little analysis and lots of hype", but credited Burr with speaking to many researchers interested in searching for a biological basis to homosexuality, and concluded that the book was worth reading, "If you can stomach this sort of thing". Porter called A Separate Creation a dispiriting comment on the state of science, writing that sexual orientation researchers have made exaggerated claims based on limited and sometimes flawed evidence.

Podhoretz described the book as a "breathless account" of its topic.

Gay media
A Separate Creation received a positive review from the physician Lawrence D. Mass in Lambda Book Report. The book was also reviewed by Stephen H. Miller in the New York Native. An excerpt appeared in The Advocate. Burr's "Gay Gene" website, based on his book, was listed as a "hot web site" by The Advocate in 1998. Tom Moon discussed Burr's views in the San Francisco Bay Times.

Mass considered Burr a "gay-positive essentialist" and A Separate Creation "a valuable historical document" comparable to the journalist Randy Shilts' And the Band Played On (1987).

Other evaluations and responses
Ron Good and Mark Hafner discussed A Separate Creation in The American Biology Teacher.

The feminist Germaine Greer and the evolutionary biologist Marlene Zuk praised A Separate Creation. However, the book was criticized by the philosophers Timothy F. Murphy and Edward Stein. Murphy wrote that Burr incorrectly stated that LeVay's 1991 neuroanatomical report on the hypothalamus was the first major biological investigation of sexual orientation. He noted that scientific study of the determinants of sexual orientation dates to the 19th century and that many investigations of the possible biological basis of homosexuality preceded LeVay's work. Stein, who noted that Burr was a journalist by background, called him "unsophisticated" for failing to discuss social constructionist views and accepting claims about the factors that cause homosexuality in fruit flies, including the discovery of a single gene that supposedly controls courtship behavior between male flies. He argued that such animal research commits the fallacy of anthropomorphism and is irrelevant to understanding sexual orientation in humans.

The psychologist Louis A. Berman described Burr's evaluation of the biological evidence as optimistic. Berman, who believes that writers supportive of gay rights have ignored professional literature dealing with efforts to change sexual orientation, noted in this connexion that though Burr conducted a two-hour interview with the psychoanalyst Charles Socarides, Burr does not mention this. According to Burr, his argument that in A Separate Creation that sexual orientation is innate prompted a call by Southern Baptists to boycott Disney films and theme parks because the book was published by Hyperion, a subsidiary of The Walt Disney Company.

See also
 Biology and sexual orientation

References

Bibliography
Books

 
 
 
 
 
 
 

Journals

  
 
  
  
  
  
  
  
 
  
  
 
  
  

Online articles

 
 
 

1996 non-fiction books
American non-fiction books
Books by Chandler Burr
English-language books
Hyperion Books books
Non-fiction books about same-sex sexuality
Popular psychology books